The Havelock Road Bombing was the detonation of a remote controlled car bomb on March 2, 1991, during rush hour in Thimbirigasyaya (also known as Havelocktown) a suburb of Colombo, Sri Lanka. According to Jane's Information Group it was carried out to assassinate Ranjan Wijeratne, the Sri Lankan Foreign Minister and Minister of State for Defense (deputy defense minister) by the Liberation Tigers of Tamil Eelam (LTTE) which was a terrorist organization fighting for a separate land for Tamils in the country. The bomb was detonated as the Minister's armored car passed it, killing 19 people including the minister, five security personal and 13 civilian by standers. Minister Wijeratne was known to have a hard line stance towards the LTTE.

The blast occurred on Havelock Road (a stretch of the Highlevel road) close to Police Field Headquarters during morning rush hour when the minister was on his way to office from his home. In 2008, Tamil Tigers accused that Ranjan Wijeratne tried to kill their leader Velupillai Prabhakaran during the 1990 peace process.

See also
2008 Weliveriya bombing

References

Attacks on civilians attributed to the Liberation Tigers of Tamil Eelam
Car and truck bombings in Sri Lanka
Massacres in Sri Lanka
Liberation Tigers of Tamil Eelam attacks in Eelam War II
Mass murder in 1991
Terrorist incidents in Sri Lanka in 1991
1991 murders in Sri Lanka
Massacres in 1991